The Marine Science Institute (MSI) is a nonprofit organization focusing on marine science research and education. MSI was founded in 1970 and currently is situated in Redwood City, California, adjacent to the Port of Redwood City. In the San Francisco Bay Area MSI has a mission driving marine education for schoolchildren and continues to receive grants to supplement their donations.

Education and research
The Marine Science Institute offers tours of the Bay in Antioch in the January and February months, and the rest of the time based out of Redwood City at their main location and research station along the banks of Redwood Creek. The institute allows students at schools around the bay to observe and interact with  the natural environment. Marine life is often collected, measured for size, and documented to add to a database to continually monitor conditions and overall health within the bay. MSI also trains teachers in integrating technology and science into their own curriculums. The Marine Science Institute also hosts an Earth Day celebration annually. Other events organized by MSI include coastal hikes, cleanups, tide walks, and voyages for the general public.

Robert G. Brownlee
The  by  research vessel built to satisfy the needs of MSI was named after Robert Brownlee whose foundation donated funds for the vessel. Original specifications for the craft had a propulsion system, that could reach 12 knots, comprising two  propellers driven by a pair of 250 horsepower Cummins diesels. The vessel, which can fit up to 70 students, has facilities for several science activities including studying plankton and fish with holding tanks below deck as well as running hydrology tests. Following the Cosco Busan oil spill the vessel was used to take children out showing the damage the Bay Bridge suffered firsthand as well as take comparative data on how the spill affected marine life in the area.

Gallery

See also

Don Edwards San Francisco Bay National Wildlife Refuge
San Francisco Bay

References

External links

 

Oceanographic organizations
Biological research institutes in the United States
Redwood City, California
Science and technology in the San Francisco Bay Area
Non-profit organizations based in the San Francisco Bay Area